Marius Gabriel Lazurca (born March 15, 1971, Timișoara) is a Romanian diplomat. He was the Romanian Ambassador to Moldova.

Biography 

Lazurca was born in 1971 in the city of Timișoara. He graduated from the University of Timișoara in 1996, where he received a diploma in French language and literature and Romanian language and literature. Lazurca has a PhD in history-anthropology from Paris-Sorbonne University and was ambassador to Holy See.

On February 9, 2010, the Romanian Parliament approved Lazurca as new ambassador to Moldova.

See also
 Embassy of romania in Chişinău
 Moldovan–Romanian relations
 Sebastian

References

External links 
 Lazurca is Romania's new ambassador to Republic of Moldova
 Romanian Embassy in Moldova (Chişinău)

Living people
1971 births
People from Timișoara
Eastern Orthodox Christians from Romania
Ambassadors of Romania to Moldova
Recipients of the Order of Honour (Moldova)
Ambassadors of Romania to Hungary